The politics of Crimea today is that of the Republic of Crimea on one hand, and that of the federal city of Sevastopol on the other, within the context of the largely unrecognised annexation of Crimea by the Russian Federation in March 2014.

The ousting of Ukrainian president Viktor Yanukovych during the 2013–14 Ukrainian revolution initiated a chain of events that culminated in an illegal referendum in Crimea on whether it should rejoin Russia or become independent (the referendum did not offer an option to maintain Crimea's status quo). Days after the official results showed overwhelming support for the proposal, Russia signed a Treaty of Accession with the self-declared independent Republic of Crimea that annexed Crimea to the Russian Federation. While the Russian Federation both claims and administers the Republic of Crimea and the city of Sevastopol as two of its federal subjects, Ukraine continues to assert that Crimea is an integral part of its territory.

Institutions

The Constitution of the Republic of Crimea is the basic law of the Republic of Crimea within the Russian Federation. It was ratified on 11 April 2014 and, de facto, replaced the previous Constitution of the Autonomous Republic of Crimea that was repealed by the Crimean status referendum. The Russian constitution was updated to list the Republic of Crimea and Sevastopol as the 84th and 85th Federal Subjects of the Russian Federation.

Parliament of Crimea

The 75-seat State Council of Crimea is the legislative branch of the Republic of Crimea. Elections are conducted under a system of mixed-member proportional representation, with 25 single-member constituencies and 50 seats filled through party-list PR. At the 2014 Crimean parliamentary election, United Russia won 70 seats, including all 25 single-member constituencies, with the Liberal Democratic Party of Russia winning 5 seats.

Before 2014, the 100-seat legislative branch of the Autonomous Republic of Crimea was called the Supreme Council of Crimea. This parliament had no right of legislative initiative. It was responsible for appointing the Council of Ministers. Following the decision of the Ukrainian parliament to dissolve the supreme council of Crimea in March 2014, the Supreme Council decided to rename itself as the State Council of Crimea, and to continue as the parliament of Crimea.

Government of Crimea

The Head of the Republic of Crimea is the highest office holder within the Republic of Crimea. This position replaced the post of Prime Minister of Crimea which is the head of the Council of Ministers according to the Constitution of the Autonomous Republic of Crimea.

After Russia's 2014 annexation most Crimean public officials weren't replaced.

Judiciary

The Judiciary is independent of the executive and the legislature branches and the responsibility of the national authorities.

In Russia, for serious and specific crimes (murder, kidnapping, rape with aggravating circumstances, child trafficking, gangsterism, large-scale bribery, treason, terrorism, public calls for violent change in the constitutional system or for the seizure of power, and select other crimes against the state), the accused have the option of a jury trial consisting of 12 jurors, who must be 25 years old, legally competent, and without a criminal record. In Ukraine, "jury trials" have 2 judges and 3 jurors, but there is confusion over whether or not these are jurors or lay judges. Russian juries are similar to common law juries, and unlike lay judges, in that they sit separately from the judges and decide questions of fact alone while the judge determines questions of law. (Russia used jury trials from 1864 to 1917, reintroduced the jury trial in 1993, and extended it to another 69 regions in 2003; Ukraine's first "jury trial" ended in October 2013 in Sumy.)

Administrative divisions

The Republic of Crimea, just as the Autonomous Republic of Crimea, is subdivided into a total of 25 regions: 14 raions (districts) and 11 city municipalities. Though the City of Sevastopol is located on the Crimean peninsula, it is administratively separately from the Republic of Crimea as a federal city. The capital of the Republic of Crimea is the City of Simferopol, located in the interior of the peninsula.

Elections and referendums

Under Russian supervision

Russian legislative election, 2016

The most recent election across Crimea was the Russian legislative election on 18 September 2016. Turnout, at 49.1% was slightly ahead of that for Russia as a whole which was only 47.8%. United Russia was the most supported political party in Crimea, achieving 72.8% of the vote.

Crimean parliamentary election, 2014

The latest parliamentary elections in Crimea were held in 2014.

Crimean Status Referendum, 2014

The referendum, held in 2014, concerned whether Crimea should declare independence and seek to join Russia.

Under Ukrainian supervision
 1994 Crimean parliamentary election
 1998 Crimean parliamentary election
 2002 Crimean parliamentary election
 2006 Crimean parliamentary election
 2010 Crimean parliamentary election

See also
Political status of Crimea
2014 Crimean crisis
Annexation of Crimea by the Russian Federation

References

External links
 
 Constitution of the Republic of Crimea
 

 
Politics of Russia
Crimea